The Scheldt is a  river that flows through northern France, western Belgium, and the southwestern part of the Netherlands, with its mouth at the North Sea. Its name is derived from an adjective corresponding to Old English  ("shallow"), Modern English shoal, Low German , West Frisian , and obsolete Swedish  ("thin").

Course
The headwaters of the Scheldt are in Gouy, in the Aisne department of northern France. It flows north through Cambrai and Valenciennes, and enters Belgium near Tournai.  Ghent developed at the confluence of the Lys, one of its main tributaries, and the Scheldt, which then turns east. Near Antwerp, the largest city on its banks, the Scheldt flows west into the Netherlands toward the North Sea.

Originally there were two branches from that point: the Oosterschelde (Eastern Scheldt); and the Westerschelde (Western Scheldt). In the 19th century, however, the Dutch built a dyke that cuts the river off from its eastern (northern) branch and connects Zuid-Beveland with the mainland (North Brabant).  Today the river continues into the Westerschelde estuary only, passing Terneuzen to reach the North Sea between Breskens in Zeelandic Flanders and Vlissingen (Flushing) on Walcheren.

The Scheldt is an important waterway, and has been made navigable from its mouth up to Cambrai. Above Cambrai, the Canal de Saint-Quentin follows its course. The port of Antwerp, the second-largest in Europe, developed on its banks. Several canals (including the Albert Canal) connect the Scheldt with the basins of the Rhine, Meuse, and Seine rivers, and with the industrial areas around Brussels, Liège, Lille, Dunkirk, and Mons.

The Scheldt flows through the following departments of France, provinces of Belgium, provinces of the Netherlands, and towns:

 Aisne (F): Gouy
 Nord (F): Cambrai, Denain, Valenciennes
 Hainaut (B): Tournai
 West Flanders (B): Avelgem
 East Flanders (B): Oudenaarde, Ghent, Dendermonde, Temse
 Antwerp (B): Antwerp
 Zeeland (NL): Hulst, Terneuzen, Sluis, Vlissingen

History

 

The Scheldt estuary has always had considerable commercial and strategic importance. Called Scaldis in Roman times, it was important for the shipping lanes to Roman Britain. Nehalennia was venerated at its mouth. The Franks took control over the region about the year 260 and at first interfered with the Roman supply routes as pirates. Later they became allies of the Romans. With the various divisions of the Frankish Empire in the 9th century, the Scheldt eventually became the border between the Western and Eastern parts of the Empire, which later became France and the Holy Roman Empire.

This status quo remained intact, at least on paper, until 1528, but by then, both the County of Flanders on the western bank and Zeeland and the Duchy of Brabant on the east were part of the Habsburg possessions of the Seventeen Provinces. Antwerp was the most prominent harbour in Western Europe. After this city fell back under Spanish control in 1585, the Dutch Republic took control of Zeelandic Flanders, a strip of land on the left bank, and closed the Scheldt for shipping. That shifted the trade to the ports of Amsterdam and Middelburg and seriously crippled Antwerp, an important and traumatic element in the history of relations between the Netherlands and what was to become Belgium.

Access to the river was the subject of the brief Kettle War of 1784, and during the French Revolution shortly afterwards, the river was reopened in 1792. Once Belgium had claimed its independence from the Netherlands in 1830, the treaty of the Scheldt determined that the river should remain accessible to ships heading for Belgian ports. Nevertheless, the Dutch government would demand a toll from passing vessels until 16 July 1863.

The Question of the Scheldt, a study providing "a history of the international legal arrangements governing the Western Scheldt", was prepared for the use of British negotiators at the Treaty of Versailles in 1919.

In the Second World War, the Scheldt estuary once again became a contested area. Despite Allied control of Antwerp, German forces still occupied fortified positions in September 1944 throughout the Scheldt estuary west and north, preventing any Allied shipping from reaching the port. In the Battle of the Scheldt, the Canadian First Army successfully cleared the area, allowing supply convoys direct access to the port of Antwerp by November 1944.

Tributaries and sub-tributaries

 Western Scheldt or Honte (Vlissingen)
 Schijn (Antwerp)
 Rupel (Rupelmonde)
 Nete (Rumst)
 Kleine Nete (Lier)
 Aa (Grobbendonk)
 Wamp (Kasterlee)
 Grote Nete (Lier)
 Wimp (Herenthout)
 Molse Nete (Geel)
 Laak (Westerlo)
 Dijle (Rumst)
 Zenne (Mechelen)
 Maalbeek (Grimbergen)
 Woluwe (Vilvoorde)
 Maalbeek (Schaerbeek)
 Molenbeek (Brussels-Laeken)
 Neerpedebeek (Anderlecht-Neerpede)
 Zuun (Sint-Pieters-Leeuw-Zuun)
 Geleytsbeek (Drogenbos)
 Linkebeek (Drogenbos)
 Molenbeek (Lot)
 Senette (Tubize)
 Hain (Tubize)
 Samme (Braine-le-Comte-Ronquières)
 Thines (Nivelles)
 Vrouwvliet (Mechelen) [further upstream named Grote Beek, Meerloop, Raambeek, Zwartwaterbeek, Boeimeer]
 Demer (Rotselaar)
 Velp (Halen)
 Gete (Halen)
 Herk (Halen)
 Melsterbeek (Herk-de-Stad)
 Grote Gete (Zoutleeuw)
 Kleine Gete (Zoutleeuw)
 Voer (Leuven)
 IJse (Huldenberg-Neerijse)
 Nethen (Grez-Doiceau-Nethen)
  (Huldenberg-Terlanen-Sint-Agatha-Rode)
 Zilverbeek (Rixensart-Genval)
 Thyle (Ottignies-Louvain-la-Neuve)
 Durme (Temse)
 Molenbeek (Wichelen)
 Dender (Dendermonde)
 Mark (Lessines-Twee-Akren)
 Ruisseau d'Ancre (Lessines)
 Zulle (Ath)
 Eastern Dender (Ath)
 Western Dender (Ath)
 Molenbeek-Ter Erpenbeek (Hofstade)
 Lys/Leie (Ghent)
 Mandel (Wielsbeke)
 Heulebeek (Kuurne)
 Gaverbeek (Kortrijk)
 Douve (Comines-Warneton)
 Deûle/Deule or Feule (Deûlémont)
 Marque (Wasquehal)
 Souchez (Lens)
 Carency (Souchez)
 Saint-Nazaire (Souchez)
 Laquette (Aire-sur-la-Lys)
 Lawe (De Gorge-Stegers)
 Brette, (Biette), Blanche, ruisseau de Caucourt, fossé d'Avesnes (Loisne)
 Clarence (Meregem)
 Nave, Grand Nocq
 Becque de Steenwerk (..)
 Zwalm (Zwalm)
 Rone (Kluisbergen)
 Rhosne (Ronse)
 Scarpe (Mortagne-du-Nord)
 Crinchon (..)
 Ugy (..)
 Haine (Condé-sur-l'Escaut)
 Trouille (Mons-Jeumont)
 Hogneau of Honneau (Condé-sur-l'Escaut)
 Honelle (Quiévrain)
 Aunelle (..)
 Grande Honelle (..)
 Petite Honelle (..)
 Rhonelle (Valenciennes)
 Écaillon (Thiant)
 Selle (Denain)
 Torrent d'Esnes
 Sensée (Bouchain)
 Hirondelle (..)
 Erclin (Iwuy)
 Eauette (Marcoing)

Navigation 

Canalisation from Cambrai down to Valenciennes was completed in 1788. Napoleon saw the benefits of linking Paris to Belgium and accelerated completion of the Canal de Saint-Quentin to the south. The locks were deepened and doubled, as coal became the essential commodity of the industrial revolution. Upgrading downstream from Bouchain was started in the 1960s in both France and Flanders, but the waterway is still not fully compliant with European standards. All the locks on the high-capacity section are being doubled by European Class Vb size locks, as part of the overall European Seine-Scheldt waterway project.

The 13 km section between Cambrai (connection with Canal de Saint-Quentin) and Hordain (connection with Canal de la Sensée) is only navigable for small ships (péniche) and has 5 locks.

In culture
Traditions says that Saint Amalberga of Temse crossed the river in Temse on the back of a big Sturgeon.

See also
 Scheldt–Rhine Canal
 Striene which was the main stem of the river until 1421, it flowed northwards.

References

External links

 Water basin of the Scheldt
 www.scheldenet.nl
 ScheldeMonitor; Research studies and monitoring activities
 Deltaworks; Flood protection works in Scheldt Delta
 International Scheldt Commission
 Scaldit - Interreg IV B NWE project for a safer and cleaner Scheldt River Basin District (FR - BE (Walloon Region - Brussels Cap. Region - Flemish Region) - NL)
 Bibliography on Water Resources and International Law Peace Palace Library
 River Escaut with maps and details of places, ports and moorings, by the author of Inland Waterways of France, Imray
 Navigation details for 80 French rivers and canals (French waterways website section)
 

 
Rivers of the Rhine–Meuse–Scheldt delta
International rivers of Europe
Rivers of France
Rivers of Belgium
Rivers of the Netherlands
1528 disestablishments in Europe
Rivers of Flanders
Rivers of Wallonia
Rivers of Aisne
Rivers of Nord (French department)
Rivers of Hauts-de-France
Rivers of Antwerp Province
Rivers of East Flanders
Rivers of Hainaut (province)
Rivers of West Flanders
Rivers of Zeeland
1520s disestablishments in the Holy Roman Empire
Ramsar sites in Belgium
Ramsar sites in the Netherlands
Ramsar sites in Metropolitan France